Calleagris krooni, Kroon's flat or Kroon's skipper, is a butterfly of the family Hesperiidae. It is found in South Africa, it is only known from Afromontane forests of Mpumalanga.

There is one generation in late summer with peaks from February to April.

References

Butterflies described in 1974
Tagiadini